Black Volcano is an inactive volcano located near Albuquerque, New Mexico, and is part of the Albuquerque volcanic field. Black Volcano is located directly north of JA volcano. Black Volcano is the second of five volcanoes (traveling south to north) within the western boundary of Petroglyph National Monument. North of Black Volcano are Vulcan, Bond and Butte volcanoes. JA, Black, and Vulcan Volcanoes are located along a single fissure through which the lava erupted. The volcanoes are a rare example of a series of vents associated with a fissure eruption. 

The volcano is composed of a type of volcanic rock called olivine tholeiitic basalt. Radiometric dating indicates an age for this rock of about 156,000 years. The volcano consists of lava flows radiation from the summit, which has a small pyroclastic cone and a large filled crater. Several smaller craters, formed late in the eruption, are located on the summit and northeast flank of the volcano. Much of the pyroclastic cone was removed by mining of cinder by 1978.

The northern part of the cone includes xenoliths, pieces of surrounding rock caught up in the eruption and carried to the surface. These are partially melted sandstone, likely of the Santa Fe Group sediments on which the volcano sits.

Gallery

Volcanoes of New Mexico
Inactive volcanoes
Geography of Albuquerque, New Mexico
Pleistocene stratovolcanoes
Landforms of Bernalillo County, New Mexico
Volcanoes of the United States
National Park Service National Monuments in New Mexico
Archaeological sites on the National Register of Historic Places in New Mexico

References